Stanek  is a village in the administrative district of Gmina Michałowo, Białystok County, Podlaskie Voivodeship,  Poland.

References

Stanek